The 1984–85 Santosh Trophy was the 41st edition of the Santosh Trophy, the main State competition for football in India. It was held Uttar Pradesh. Punjab defeated Maharashtra 3–0 in the final to win the competition for their fourth time.

Quarter Final Group A

Quarter Final Group B

Semi-finals

Final

References

External links 
 Santosh Trophy 1985 at Rec.Sport.Soccer Statistics Foundation

Santosh Trophy seasons
1984–85 in Indian football